The 1987 Chicago White Sox season was the White Sox's 88th season. They finished with a record of 77-85, giving them 5th place in the American League West, 8 games behind of the 1st place Minnesota Twins. The White Sox spent most of 1987 in the cellar, occupying last place from June 9 until September 30, but won 9 of their last 10 to pass the Texas Rangers and California Angels in the season's final week.

Offseason 
 December 11, 1986 – The Chicago White Sox send Gene Nelson and Bruce Tanner to the Oakland Athletics in exchange for Donnie Hill.
 January 5, 1987: Randy Velarde was traded by the Chicago White Sox with Pete Filson to the New York Yankees for Scott Nielsen and Mike Soper (minors).
 January 21, 1987: Jerry Royster was signed as a free agent with the Chicago White Sox.

Regular season

Season standings

Record vs. opponents

Opening Day lineup 
 Gary Redus, CF
 Donnie Hill, 2B
 Harold Baines, RF
 Carlton Fisk, DH
 Greg Walker, 1B
 Iván Calderón, LF
 Tim Hulett, 2B
 Ozzie Guillén, SS
 Ron Karkovice, C
 Richard Dotson, P

Notable transactions 
 June 2, 1987: 1987 Major League Baseball draft
 Jack McDowell was drafted by the White Sox in the 1st round (5th pick). Player signed July 29, 1987.
 Buddy Groom was drafted by the White Sox in the 12th round. Player signed June 9, 1987.
 July 13, 1987: Mike Maksudian was signed by the Chicago White Sox as an amateur free agent.
 August 6, 1987: Johnnie LeMaster was signed as a free agent with the Chicago White Sox.
 August 26, 1987: Jerry Royster was traded by the Chicago White Sox with Mike Soper (minors) to the New York Yankees for a player to be named later and Ken Patterson. The New York Yankees sent Jeff Pries (minors) (September 19, 1987) to the Chicago White Sox to complete the trade.

Roster

Player stats

Batting 
Note: G = Games played; AB = At bats; R = Runs scored; H = Hits; 2B = Doubles; 3B = Triples; HR = Home runs; RBI = Runs batted in; BB = Base on balls; SO = Strikeouts; AVG = Batting average; SB = Stolen bases

Pitching 
Note: W = Wins; L = Losses; ERA = Earned run average; G = Games pitched; GS = Games started; SV = Saves; IP = Innings pitched; H = Hits allowed; R = Runs allowed; ER = Earned runs allowed; HR = Home runs allowed; BB = Walks allowed; K = Strikeouts

Farm system 

LEAGUE CHAMPIONS: Birmingham

References

External links 
 1987 Chicago White Sox at Baseball Reference

Chicago White Sox seasons
Chicago White Sox season
Chicago